William J. Pomeroy (November 25, 1916 – January 12, 2009) was an American communist, poet, author, and ghostwriter, who served the American army in the Pacific during World War II. He had a connection with the Philippine guerillas during the war, supplying them with materials. He also organized a protest against the decision of the U.S. government to treat the guerillas as enemies. He married Celia Mariano, a Filipina who was a member of the Hukbalahap in 1948.

In 1952, he and Celia were captured by government forces in the Sierra Madre in the Philippines. They were given a life sentence, but were released in 1962, although Celia was refused a passport. Pomeroy began to campaign, including lobbying Bertrand Russell and Graham Greene. The fight was successful but the Pomeroys were denied entry to the US, so instead settled in England.

Early life 
William J. Pomeroy was born on November 25, 1916, in the town of Waterloo, New York, into a working-class family. During the 1930s he moved from job to job and read avidly. By 1937, he was a factory worker in Rochester, New York. He joined the Young Communist League in 1938.

World War II 
Pomeroy had strong ties with the Filipino guerrillas known as the Hukbalahap during World War II. He supplied the guerrillas with the materials they needed for the war. His wife Celia was also a guerrilla during the war. Pomeroy was known to be a legendary fighter for Philippines freedom and independence. During World War II, he was deployed with the 5th Air Force of Douglas MacArthur.

Writing 
Prolific as a writer, Pomeroy contributed to Daily World on developments in Africa, Latin America, Asia, Europe, and the Philippines. His publications included Apartheid, Imperialism, and African Freedom; Apartheid Axis: United States and South Africa; American Neo-Colonialism: Its Emergence in the Philippines and Asia; Guerrilla Warfare and Marxism; The Forest (1963). He also published a collection of short stories, Trail of Blame, and poetry: Beyond Barriers and Sonnets for Celia (1963), the latter comprising love poems for his wife composed while they were in prison. He served as the ghostwriter for the autobiography of Luis Taruc, a leader of the Hukbalahap group, titled Born of the People (1953).

References

Publications and external links
 Pomeroy, William J. "Half a Century of Socialism: Soviet Life in the Sixties". New York: International Publishers, 1967.
 Guerrilla Warfare and Marxism, edited by Pomeroy, 1968.

1916 births
2009 deaths
American communists
American expatriates in the Philippines
American male writers
People from Waterloo, New York